The Steel Key is a 1953 British thriller film directed by Robert S. Baker and starring Terence Morgan, Joan Rice and Raymond Lovell.

Premise
Adventurer Johnny O'Flynn (Terence Morgan) attempts to track down thieves who have stolen a secret military formula for producing hardened steel; but ruthless others who will stop at nothing are also on the trail.

Cast
 Terence Morgan as Johnny O'Flynn
 Joan Rice as Doreen Wilson
 Raymond Lovell as Inspector Forsythe
 Dianne Foster as Sylvia Newman
 Hector Ross as Beroni
 Colin Tapley as Doctor Crabtree
 Esmond Knight as Professor Newman
 Arthur Lovegrove as Gilchrist
 Sam Kydd as Chauffeur
 Esma Cannon as Patient in Doctor's Waiting Room
 Michael Balfour as Sailor
 Tom Gill as Hotel Receptionist
 Cyril Smith as Boat Owner (uncredited)
 Ben Williams as Taxi Driver (uncredited)

Critical reception
TV Guide gave the film two out of five stars, calling it a "Silly spy drama...The complicated plot doesn't quite work, but audiences should enjoy it anyway"; while Allmovie wrote, "a little-known British melodrama with some potent talent involved, including actors Terence Morgan and Joan Rice and future Saint director Robert Baker"; and Fantastic Movie Musings and Ramblings concluded, "It's a British B-movie thriller with slight touches of noir to it, and it's moderately entertaining. It's worth a look for the curious, if you can find it."

References

External links

1953 films
1950s thriller films
British thriller films
Films directed by Robert S. Baker
British black-and-white films
Films set in London
Films shot in London
1950s English-language films
1950s British films